Brazil participated at the 2017 Summer Universiade in Taipei, Taiwan.

Medalists

Competitors

Athletics 

Men
Track & road events

Field events

Combined events

Women
Track & road events

Field events

Combined events

Badminton

Diving 

Men

Women

Fencing

Football

Men's tournament

Preliminary round

9th–16th place

9th–12th place semifinals

9th place match

Women's tournament

Preliminary round

Quarterfinals

Semifinals

Final

Gymnastics

Rhythmic

Judo 

Men

Women

Swimming 

Men

*Heats only

Women

Table tennis

Taekwondo

Tennis

Volleyball

Men's tournament 

Preliminary round

|}

|}

Quarterfinals

|}

5th–8th place semifinals

|}

5th place match

|}

Women's tournament 

Preliminary round

|}

|}

9th–16th place quarterfinals

|}

9th–16th place quarterfinals

|}

9th place match

|}

Weightlifting

Wushu

References

External links
NUSF Overview - Brazil

Nations at the 2017 Summer Universiade
2017
2017 in Brazilian sport